Viacheslav Vladimirovich Zakhartsov (born March 30, 1968, in Omsk) is a Russian chess Grandmaster (2007).

Chess career
In 2007 he tied for 1st–9th with Alexei Fedorov, Vladimir Potkin, Aleksej Aleksandrov, Andrei Deviatkin, Alexander Evdokimov, Denis Khismatullin, Evgeny Tomashevsky and Sergei Azarov in the Aratovsky Memorial in Saratov. In 2009, tied for 1st–2nd with Marat Dzhumaev in the Cappelle-la-Grande Open. In 2011, tied for 2nd–7th with Deep Sengupta, Maxim Turov, Krisztian Szabo, Lev Gutman, Dávid Bérczes and Samuel Shankland in the ZMDI Schachfestival in Dresden. In 2014, he tied for 1st–4th in the ZMDI Open tournament in Dresden.

References

External links

Viacheslav Zakhartsov – Yearbook Surveys – New In Chess

1968 births
Living people
Sportspeople from Rostov-on-Don
Chess grandmasters
Russian chess players